Argyrotaenia cacaoticaria is a species of moth of the family Tortricidae. It is found in Morona-Santiago Province of Ecuador and in Peru.

The wingspan is about 18 mm. The ground colour elements of the forewings are indistinct, brown scaled dark brown, with some cream scales in the terminal area. There is a weak rust spot in the middle subterminally. The markings are dark blackish brown. The hindwings are greyish brown, but darker on the periphery.

Etymology
The species name refers to the cocoa-colour of the forewings.

References

C
Tortricidae of South America
Moths described in 2006